Franco Scisciani (born 8 January 1934) is an Italian boxer. He competed in the men's light middleweight event at the 1956 Summer Olympics. At the 1956 Summer Olympics, he defeated Eugène Legrand of France, before losing to José Torres of the United States.

References

1934 births
Living people
Italian male boxers
Olympic boxers of Italy
Boxers at the 1956 Summer Olympics
Boxers from Rome
Light-middleweight boxers
20th-century Italian people